Patrik Wallón (born May 2, 1988, in Skellefteå) is a Swedish ice hockey player. He is currently playing with Skellefteå AIK in the Elitserien.

References

External links

1988 births
Living people
Skellefteå AIK players
Swedish ice hockey defencemen
People from Skellefteå Municipality
Sportspeople from Västerbotten County